Events from the year 2016 in the Czech Republic

Incumbents
 President – Miloš Zeman
 Prime Minister – Bohuslav Sobotka

Events

14 April – The  Czech Republic's political leadership agreed to make Czechia the official short name in English. 
2 May – Czechia was approved by the Czech cabinet.
5 July – Czechia was published in the United Nations UNTERM and UNGEGN country name databases.
 10 October – Czech botanists announce the discovery of a new species of Thismia in Borneo.

In popular culture

Sports
28 June – 3 July – The 2016 UCI Mountain Bike & Trials World Championships were hosted in the town of Nové Město na Moravě.

Film
1 July – Anthropoid, historical thriller film directed by Sean Ellis, premieres at the Karlovy Vary International Film Festival.

Deaths

22 January – Miloslav Ransdorf, politician (born 1953)
13 February – Bořek Šípek, architect (born 1949) 
25 February – 
Zdeněk Smetana, animator (born 1925)
Miloš Hájek, historian and politician (born 1921)
18 March – Jan Němec, filmmaker (born 1936)
2 April – Boris Hybner, actor (born 1941)
13 April – Věra Kubánková, actress (born 1924)
12 May – Bohumil Kubát, wrestler, Olympic bronze medallist (born 1935)
13 May – Jan Korger, politician (born 1937)
14 May – Jaroslav Malina, scenographer (born 1937)
22 May – Adolf Born, painter (born 1930)
23 May – Zdeněk Mézl, printmaker (born 1934)
27 May – František Jakubec, football player (born 1956)
16 June – Luděk Macela, football player (born 1950)
5 July – Zdeněk Neubauer, philosopher and biologist (born 1942)
12 July – Antonín Rükl, astronomer (born 1932)
24 July – Bohuslav Kokotek, Lutheran clergyman (born 1949)
26 August – Jiří Tichý, football player (born 1933)
30 August – Věra Čáslavská, gymnast, seven-time Olympic gold medallist (born 1942)
5 September – Jaroslav Jareš, football player (born 1930)
9 September – Zdeněk Měřínský, archaeologist (born 1948)
26 September – Karel Růžička, pianist (born 1940)
8 November – Zdeněk Altner, lawyer (born 1947)
4 December – Radim Hladík, guitarist (born 1946)
23 December – Luba Skořepová, actress (born 1923)
26 December – Petr Hájek, scientist (born 1940)

References

 
Years of the 21st century in the Czech Republic
Czech Republic